Vaikom, is a municipal town and a capital town of Vaikom Taluk, situated in the northwest of Kottayam district in the state of Kerala, India. The town is also noted for its role in the Indian independence movement for being the venue of Vaikom Satyagraham, a civil rights movement aimed at securing freedom of movement for all sections of society through the public roads leading to the Vaikom Shiva Temple.

Location

Vaikom town is situated at the northwestern end of Kottayam district, close to Ernakulam district border. Vaikom is a lakeside town situated in the banks of the Vembanad lake similar to other lakeside towns like Kottayam and Changanassery. Its western borders are bound by the Vembanad lake. The Muvattupuzha river has its mouth near Vaikom where it empties into the Vembanad lake, many distributaries of the Muvattupuzha river pass through Vaikom. It is also close to the tourism destination Kumarakom and the city of Kochi.

Vaikom Temple

The Vaikom Shiva Temple, known as Thekkan Kashi (Southern Kashi), is the centre of the town, and is the site of the Vaikom Ashtami celebrations during November. It is notable as the venue of the Vaikom Agitation for achieving for the lower castes the right to walk on the roads surrounding the temple. One of the most popular temples in Kerala dedicated to Lord Shiva, it was built in 1594.

Administration
Vaikom is administered by a municipality and is the seat of a munsiff's court (among the oldest to be established in the Kingdom of Travancore, 100 years old). Vaikom assembly constituency is part of Kottayam parliamentary constituency.

History

Vaikom was believed to be a part of a kingdom called Venmalanadu in the past. When Venmalanadu was split into Vadakkumkoor and Thekkumkoor, it became part of Vadakkumkoor dynasty. Vadakkumkoor kingdom spread along the path of Muvattupuzha river towards the north east side from Kaduthuruthy, Vaikom, Piravom, Muvattupuzha, Kothamangalam and Thodupuzha. There was an important port at Chemmanakary, near Vaikom during the Vadakkumkoor era. Later in 1742, it became part of Travancore when the then Maharajah of Travancore, Anizham Thirunal Marthanda Varma, annexed Vadakkumkoor to his kingdom.

Vaikom gained its fame on a national level during Vaikom Satyagraha.

Economy

The traditional economy has been based on coconut and rice crops, and fishing; more recently, crops like nutmeg, black pepper, and latex have been introduced. Tourism and software are also pursued as a means to livelihood. Hindustan Newsprint Limited is situated in Velloor near Vaikom.

Demographics
As per the 2001 census, Vaikom has a population of about 22637 (male: 10955; female: 11682). This region has a literacy rate of 92% (male: 97%; female: 90%). Population density of the region is 2496 per square km.

As per the 2011 census, The Vaikom municipality has a population of 23,234 of which 11,304 are males while 11,930 are females. The population of children under age 6 is 1807, which is 7.78% of the total population of Vaikom (M). In Vaikom municipality, the female sex ratio is of 1055 against the state average of 1084. The male child sex ratio in Vaikom is around 960, compared to the Kerala state average of 964. The literacy rate of Vaikom city is 96.84%, higher than the state average of 94.00%. In Vaikom, male literacy is around 98.30% while female literacy rate is 95.47%.

Hindus are the largest religious community in Vaikom, accounting for 85% of the population. Christians represent 12%, and Muslims 3%.

Notable people

Mar Sebastian Adayantharath 
Chempil Arayan - Admiral of the fleet of the Kingdom of Travancore
Chembil Ashokan - actor
Justice K. G. Balakrishnan
Vaikom Muhammad Basheer
P. K. Biju
Cherian K. Cherian
V. N. Janaki
Janardhanan - actor
A. J. John
Monce Joseph
M. K. Kamalam
Abraham Kattumana
Kalaikkal Kumaran - actor
Mammootty - actor
Mathew Ulakamthara, Indian Malayalam language poet and literary critic.
N. Mohanan
Vaikom Chandrasekharan Nair
N. N. Pillai
P. Krishna Pillai- leader of the first communist movement in Kerala
Vaikom Padmanabha Pillai- Military officer of the Kingdom of Travancore
Vaikom Ramachandran - poet
Thomas Unniyadan
Vaikom Vijayalakshmi
Vaikom Viswan
S. Ramesan, Malayalam language poet and orator

See also
Vallakam

References

External links

 
Cities and towns in Kottayam district
Kingdom of Travancore